The Men's sprint event at the 2012 European Track Championships of track cycling was held on 20 October 2012. The event began with 27 riders participating in a qualifying round, and culminated in a final where Russian cyclist Denis Dmitriev won the gold medal.

Medalists

Results

Qualifying
Fastest 24 riders advanced to the 1/16 finals, it was held at 10:00.

1/16 Finals
Winner of each heat qualified to 1/8 Finals, the races were held at 10:55.

1/8 Finals
Winner of each heat qualified to 1/4 Finals, losers went to the repêchage. The races were held at 11:41.

1/8 Finals Repechage
The loser of the 1/8 Finals raced, winners advanced to the Quarterfinals. Races were held at 12:09.

Quarterfinals
The races were held at 12:42, 13:26 and 13:51.

Race for 5th–8th Places
It was held at 20:56.

Semifinals
The races were held at 19:36 and 20:28.

Finals
The races were held at 21:12, 21:39 and 21:45.

References

Men's sprint
European Track Championships – Men's sprint